A Tale of Two Cities was a speech delivered by New York Governor Mario Cuomo on July 16, 1984, at the Democratic National Convention in San Francisco, California. The speech galvanized the convention; it was watched on television by nearly 80 million people and received copious attention in the media. Less than halfway through his first term as governor, Cuomo was widely celebrated for the speech, and he took on new political cachet as a Democratic leader on a national scale.

Background 
Mario Cuomo was elected Governor of New York on a Democratic Party ticket in 1982. In his inaugural address, he constructed Democratic values metaphorically as caring for a family. The speech was well received by members of both the Democratic and Republican parties and displayed Cuomo's skill as an orator. Throughout his first year as Governor Cuomo supported numerous liberal policies even as conservatism was growing in popularity, garnering him national attention. A presidential election was scheduled to take place in the United States in November 1984. President Ronald Reagan was a popular conservative and was widely projected to win reelection. Though the country had endured economic hardship early on in his term, by 1984 the situation had begun to improve.

In March 1984 Gary Hart, a senator seeking the Democratic Party's nomination for the presidential election, openly citing inspiration from Cuomo, stated, "I'd like to talk about the family of America." The governor, however, had endorsed leading candidate Walter Mondale. Mondale inquired as Cuomo's interest in joining his campaign to seek the Vice Presidency. Cuomo stated that he had promised to finish his four-year term as governor, but indicated that he would not be opposed to delivering the keynote address at the 1984 Democratic National Convention (DNC) in San Francisco, California. Mondale thought he was the best choice for the role, as he believed Cuomo could win him the support of Italian Americans as well as the so-called "Cuomo majority", a coalition of black, Hispanic, white liberal, and labor unionist voters that supported his gubernatorial campaign. Others hoped Cuomo could win over Democrats who had voted for Reagan in 1980 as well as independent voters. The governor had promised former President Jimmy Carter that he would assist Mondale (Carter's Vice President) any way he could, and Mondale told him, "If you want to help me, you'll give the speech." Cuomo did not believe he had a high enough national profile for such an event and felt that Senator Edward M. Kennedy would make for a better speaker. Mondale expressed disdain towards the suggestion. Michael Del Giudice, the governor's chief of staff, urged Cuomo to accept the offer, believing it was a good opportunity for him to express his beliefs and a chance to bolster Mondale's support. Del Giudice felt that even if the speech had an unimpressive reception, it would not cause Mondale's campaign significant harm. David W. Burke thought delivering the keynote was a bad idea and cautioned against it. Cuomo's son, Andrew, and his communications director, Tim Russert, shared the governor's anxieties that a bad performance would reflect poorly on him and damage his own political prospects. Nevertheless, they encouraged him to take up the role of keynote speaker.

Kennedy was upset that Mondale did not want him to be the keynote speaker and stated that the person chosen for the role should be among the Democrats who had remained neutral during the presidential primaries. Cuomo agreed in principle, and told Mondale's staff that if he were ultimately made keynote speaker it would have to be made clear to Kennedy that Cuomo had thought he was a better fit and that he had been chosen at the behest of Mondale. On the evening of June 20, Kennedy called Cuomo over the phone. Cuomo stated that he had turned down Mondale's offer and tried to convince him to select the senator instead. Kennedy said he had heard from Mondale's aides that Mondale wanted Cuomo to give the speech, and said "I am calling, Mario, to say I think you should say yes. I can't think of anyone better...if they get back to you, you ought to say yes. I will do whatever they want me to do." By the end of the conversation, Cuomo was persuaded to accept the role of keynote speaker. An hour later he received a phone call from Mondale and DNC Chairman Charles Manatt. According to Cuomo, he then realized they had coordinated with Kennedy to try and convince him to deliver the keynote. The governor wrote in his diary, "They tried very hard to sound warm, sincere, and endearing, and none of it worked." Cuomo accepted Mondale's renewed offer, though he voiced his belief that the candidate had made a mistake. Cuomo was officially announced as the DNC keynote speaker on June 21. He was the first New Yorker to be designated the role since Martin H. Glynn in 1916.

Andrew Cuomo and Russert reviewed footage of past convention keynote addresses to devise a strategy for maximizing the speech's resonance with the audience. Mario Cuomo spent several days sifting through various ideas and determining his argument. He penned a draft on July 7. Lawyer Mark J. Green and journalist Jack Newfield both offered suggestions for the language. Cuomo read numerous versions aloud in the dining room of the New York State Executive Mansion to his advisers and went through up to 60 different drafts before he was "comfortable" with the work. When he felt it was nearly finished, he presented it to his staff in the press room of the governor's office in 2 World Trade Center. They were unmoved, so he revised his argument by moving his criticism of Reagan's policies from the middle of the speech to the beginning. Cuomo delivered it again, but Andrew voiced his concern that the ending was not rhetorically potent. Cuomo's chief speechwriter, Peter Quinn, then read through the governor's diaries to find a life event he could write about. Quinn settled on incorporating a story of Cuomo's father, an Italian immigrant, working long shifts at his grocery store until his feet bled.

Prelude 
Cuomo arrived in San Francisco around 12:00am on July 15. Later in the morning he went to the George R. Moscone Convention Center, the venue for the DNC, to rehearse his speech. He sat in the empty convention hall and made several late edits to the transcript—the copy supplied for the teleprompter was marked with numerous hand-written revisions. The governor told the press "It won't be a tub-thumper but rather a methodical attempt to deal with the issues. I'm not good at bringing people to their feet. I'm going to try to bring people to their senses."

The address was scheduled for July 16, and it would be Cuomo's first major appearance on national television. He was introduced in a fashion unusual for the time: before he took the stage, a six-minute film about his upbringing in New York was played. Andrew Cuomo and Russert, having observed the ambivalence of the crowds in past convention footage and fearing it would impact television viewers' reception, believed the video would make the audience more attentive to the governor's speech. Following the introduction, the lights in the convention center darkened and a single spotlight tracked Cuomo as he walked over to the podium. This was also designed to capture the audience's focus, as well as to force the television news cameras to follow the governor instead of panning over the crowd. The Secret Service agents providing security thought dimming the lights would leave the convention more vulnerable to a gunman and objected. Andrew Cuomo argued with them by the control room operator to have the action carried out. The governor later said that he was "not happy about being there" and "very eager to get it over with".

The speech 
Cuomo's address was entitled A Tale of Two Cities. It was 4,308 words in length. Cuomo opened by invoking his family rhetoric, emphasizing the inclusiveness and openness of his message. He dismissed "the stories and the poetry" for which he was well known and declared his intent to be forthright:

Cuomo proceeded to bring his audience's attention to a recent statement by Reagan at a campaign event and aimed to highlight a contradiction he saw in the president's use of the phrase "shining city on a hill":

Cuomo then attacked Reagan's rhetoric by using imagery to craft an actuality in stark contrast to his vision. He listed specific, dramatic examples of exceptions to the president's notions:

He subsequently addressed Reagan directly, sardonically calling him "Mr. President", and encapsulating his own message of vast inequality in America in a metaphorical allusion to Charles Dickens's novel, A Tale of Two Cities:

Cuomo followed by suggesting that Reagan was unfamiliar with the realities of most Americans' lives and listing places—locations where people had not benefited from economic recovery—he could go to view such realities. This undermined the president's credibility and conjured up a series of emotional images. He utilized anaphora for emphasis:

Cuomo paused as the audience applauded. He sarcastically utilized spin to accuse Reagan of explicitly endorsing the philosophy of Social Darwinism:

Cuomo proceeded to compare Republicans to President Herbert Hoover, whose tenure was marked by the Great Depression and who was widely perceived as having done little to assist those struggling economically. By drawing a parallel, the governor was suggesting the Republican Party—and by extension, Reagan—would do just as much:

He then brought the Democratic Party into his discussion and asserted—using extensive imagery with an analogy of a wagon train—that it more genuinely upheld family values. He also alluded to the biblical phrase, "The meek shall inherit the earth", to further attack Republican philosophy:

Enunciating his claim that Democrats supported family values, Cuomo invoked Franklin D. Roosevelt—widely admired by Democrats—highlighting his efforts as president and suggesting that his physical disability would make him a victim of Republican policy. He also emotionally celebrated Democratic social accomplishments:

Conceding Reagan's strengths as a communicator, the governor provided a plan for Democrats to garner electoral support and returned to the "Tale of Two Cities" theme:

Next Cuomo, invoking the biblical Tower of Babel, warned against factitious disagreement and urged Democrats to support party unity. He used alliteration for emphasis:

The address was interrupted 52 times by applause.

Aftermath and reception 
The audience enthusiastically applauded the address. As Cuomo descended from the stage, he asked his son, "How'd it go?" Andrew grabbed his shoulders and responded, "They love you!" Though many journalists attempted to interview him, Cuomo departed in the evening and flew back to the Executive Mansion in Albany, New York. He later attributed the apparent success of the speech to the audience, saying that while they had "devastated" the speakers before him, when he took to the podium "they were all looking at me silently. It wasn't that I captured them. They were ready."

An estimated 79 million people saw the address on television. Cuomo received hundreds of letters of praise for his convention performance. James Reston wrote that it was "brilliant...with every word, gesture, expression and pause in harmony." In a July 21 analysis of the DNC, Dudley Clendinen of The New York Times wrote "Governor Cuomo's speech showed it was possible for a Democrat to combat President Reagan on television with philosophy and metaphor, that passion could be the party's engine and oratory its modern weapon." Murray Kempton of Newsday remarked that "For a little less time than it takes a subway from Far Rockaway to Manhattan, Mario Cuomo had taken all the broken promises and put them together shining and renewed, and he had restored the Democratic Party to virginity." Arkansas Governor Bill Clinton, expressing disappointment over the substance of the speech, asked Colorado Governor Dick Lamm, "C’mon, what did it really say about the issues we’re trying to raise?"

Conservative reception of the speech was much less positive. William Safire remarked that it was "the best-delivered keynote address since the days of Alben Barkley—devoid only of humor...[Cuomo] almost succeeded in giving compassion a good name." Robert Reno of Newsday labeled it "standard bleeding heart doctrine." Columnist George Will wrote that Cuomo deserved a "C for substance, A for delivery," adding, "Cuomo did what a keynote speaker is supposed to do...style being ten times more important than content on such occasions, he convinces the conventioneers that they are the children of light, destined to push back the darkness."

A spokesman for the Reagan presidential campaign stated that the speech was "a well-crafted litany of cheap shots and half-truths." Nevertheless, Reagan deemed Cuomo's rhetorical appeals to working-class voters to be of threatening strength and re-orientated his campaign to ensure their support. Reagan defeated Mondale in a landslide in the November election. Richard Greene opined that due to this fact and that many of the issues Cuomo highlighted were not subsequently addressed, the speech failed in its immediate goal.

Legacy 
According to Walter Shapiro, Cuomo's address "defined—for then and now—what it means to be a liberal." Michael Waldman said it was "as powerful a statement of core, traditional, liberal Democratic philosophy as you'll ever get." Representative Nancy Pelosi called it "one of the top ten speeches in history." Andrei Cherny wrote, "A hundred years from now, if there is one speech that people will study and remember from a Democratic politician in the last quarter of the 20th century, it will rightly be Cuomo's 1984 address. It is hard to overstate the impact it had on a generation of the party's speechwriters, strategists and policy thinkers." He opined that the address was wholly lacking in actionable promises and was too focused on the Democratic Party's past accomplishments. Likening it to William Jennings Bryan's 1896 Cross of Gold speech which, though well received, was not conscious of impending modernization and did not lead to political success, he concluded that "The lengthened shadow of Cuomo's address has contributed to inhibiting the growth of a new, unifying, positive appeal that puts progress back at the heart of progressivism." Michael A. Cohen wrote in 2015, "[D]on’t call it a great 'political' speech...what's often forgotten about Cuomo's speech is that in reflecting the core beliefs of the Democratic Party he was decidedly out of tune with the tenor of the times." He added, "[H]owever...there is an increasing sense that the two cities of which Cuomo spoke are the defining construct of American life, circa 2015. His unapologetic liberalism might have fallen flat politically in 1984, but it might be even more relevant today."

Jeff Shesol called the oration "Mario Cuomo's finest moment". Quinn said "[I]f Mondale had given that speech, no one would have ever remembered it." Cuomo died on January 1, 2015. Most of his obituaries mentioned the address. Hundreds of people subsequently shared YouTube video of it over social media.

Notes

Citations

References 

 
 
 
 
 

1984 speeches
Democratic National Conventions
1984 United States presidential election